Li Wentang (born 1965) is a Chinese university administrator and politician who is the current chief education officer of the Central Party School of the Chinese Communist Party, in office since July 2022.

He is an alternate member of the 20th Central Committee of the Chinese Communist Party.

Biography
Li was born in Jinhua County (now Jinhua), Zhejiang, in 1965, and graduated from Shandong University and the Institute of Philosophy, Chinese Academy of Social Sciences. He also studied at the University of Lausanne and the University of Basel. He was a visiting scholar at the University of Munich and the University of Ireland.

Beginning in 1996, he served in several posts in the Central Party School of the Chinese Communist Party, including lecturer, professor, deputy director and director of Teaching and Research Department, and director of Education and Research Department of Culture and History. In July 2022, he was appointed chief education officer, a position at vice-ministerial level.

Publications

References

1965 births
Living people
People from Jinhua
Shandong University alumni
University of Lausanne alumni
University of Basel alumni
Academic staff of the Central Party School of the Chinese Communist Party
People's Republic of China politicians from Zhejiang
Chinese Communist Party politicians from Zhejiang
Alternate members of the 20th Central Committee of the Chinese Communist Party